The Ozark Mountain AVA is an American Viticultural Area located in northwest Arkansas, southern Missouri, and northeast Oklahoma. Four smaller AVAs have been established within its boundaries, to recognize those distinct regions whose climate, vineyard soil, or other growing conditions create unique areas for viticulture. The hardiness zone in the region varies from 6a to 7b.

References

External links
 Ozark Mountain Wine Trail

American Viticultural Areas
Arkansas wine
Missouri wine
Oklahoma wine
1986 establishments in Oklahoma
1986 establishments in Missouri
1986 establishments in Arkansas